William Herbert Mortensen (January 27, 1897 – August 12, 1965) was an American glamour photographer, primarily known for his Hollywood portraits in the 1920s–1940s in the Pictorialist style.

Early life
Mortensen was born on January 27, 1897, in Park City, Utah, the son of Danish immigrants Agnes and William Peter Mortensen, who had immigrated from Copenhagen, Denmark in 1883.

Before serving in World War I, Mortensen graduated from East Side High School in Salt Lake City. He then served as Private in Company D of the 13th Regiment of the United States Infantry from August 6, 1918, to May 16, 1919. At his enlistment, he recorded his occupation as painting.

After his discharge from the army, Mortensen briefly studied illustration at the Art Students League in New York City.

In May 1920 he traveled in Greece, Italy, Egypt and Constantinople to "sketch for educational purposes". He returned to Utah, then traveled to Hollywood as an escort for his friend's sister, Fay Wray.
After two years at the Art Students League he was declared to have "no talent for drawing". Undeterred by this verdict he borrowed money and took off for Greece, to make etchings of the monuments of ancient Attica.

Career

Mortensen was a very self-critical man who began his photographic career taking portraits of Hollywood actors and film stills. During the 1920s and 1930s, he was inspired by horror films being adapted in studios, and ended up making portraits about them in his own style. His favorite photographic topics were of witches, dancers, demons, peasants, and Shakespearean actors.

In 1931 he moved to the artist community of Laguna Beach, California, where he opened a studio and the William Mortensen School of Photography.

Working in the Pictorialist style, he manipulated photographs using pens, paints, pumice and razor blades to produce romanticist painting-like effects. Mortensen's style of art consisted of him using a bromoil process. The style brought him criticism from straight photographers of the modern realist movement and, in particular, he carried on a prolonged written debate with Ansel Adams in the pages of Camera Craft magazine.

His arguments defending romanticist photography led him to be "ostracized from most authoritative canons of photographic history". In an essay, Larry Lytle wrote, "Due to his approach—both technically and philosophically in opposition to straight or purist adherents—he is amongst the most problematic figures in photography in the twentieth-century ... historians and critics have described his images as "...anecdotal, highly sentimental, mildly erotic hand-colored prints...", "...bowdlerized versions of garage calendar pin-ups and sadomasochist entertainments...", "...contrived set-ups and sappy facial expressions...", and Ansel Adams variously referred to Mortensen as the "Devil", and "the anti-Christ." In addition, the more realistic photojournalism emerging from World War II correspondents, and carried in national newsmagazines, caused Mortensen's more posed and contrived photos to fade from the public mind. He was largely forgotten by the time of his death in 1965.<ref name="Bess Lovejoy">{{cite web |url=http://www.smithsonianmag.com/arts-culture/photographer-who-ansel-adams-called-anti-christ-180953525/ |first=Bess |last=Lovejoy |title=The Photographer Who Ansel Adams Called The Anti-Christ|website=smithsonianmag.com |department=Arts & Culture |publisher=Smithsonian |location=Washington, DC |date=December 4, 2014 |access-date=January 29, 2015}}</ref>

Recent years have brought praise for Mortensen's development of manipulation techniques and a renewed interest in his work. In 2013, one of Mortenson's students, portrait photographer Robert Balcomb, published a book—Me and Mortensen—about his time studying with Mortensen in Laguna Beach.

He wrote nine books about technique in photography in conjunction with George Dunham.

Mortensen was awarded the Hood medal from the Royal Photographic Society in 1949.

BibliographyIn order of original publication date except where noted. 

Revised 

Republished 

Collections

Documentary

References

External links

 Includes links to reviews, essays, a documentary, and a PDF of Monsters & Madonnas''.

  

 This contains discussion and examples of his nude photography.

1897 births
1965 deaths
20th-century American photographers
American portrait photographers
American people of Danish descent
People from Park City, Utah
Pictorialists
Photographers from California